Aleksander Kiidelmaa (26 September 1896 – 16 August 1969) was an Estonian trade unionist and Communist politician who was the mayor of Tallinn from July 1940 to January 1941, and again (as the chairman of the Executive Committee of Tallinn) from September 1944 to February 1945.

He was also a member of the Supreme Soviet of the Estonian SSR from 1940 to 1947. He was the mayor of Tallinn under the occupation of the Soviet Union during their occupation of the Baltic States from 1940 to 1941. He was later the chairman of the Executive Committee of Tallinn from September 1944 to February 1945, in the immediate aftermath of the Soviet Union reconquering Estonia from the Nazi German forces.

He died on 16 August 1969 in Tallinn, and was buried on 29 August at Metsakalmistu.

See also
List of mayors of Tallinn

References

1896 births
1969 deaths
Politicians from Narva
People from Yamburgsky Uyezd
Communist Party of Estonia politicians
Members of the Supreme Soviet of the Estonian Soviet Socialist Republic, 1940–1947
Mayors of Tallinn
Burials at Metsakalmistu